Since the 2007 municipal reform, Ringkøbing-Skjern municipality has been a strong area for centre-right Venstre. However, in 2017, Venstre won only 11 seats, 3 less than they did in 2013. This meant they were 4 seats short of a majority. The Christian Democrats who won 6 seats, and became the joint 2nd biggest party, were looking to get their first mayor in a Danish municipality. However, in a surprising turn of events, the Social Democrats ended up supporting Hans Østergaard from Venstre instead, citing multiple reasons, such as the Christian Democrats being a small party nationwide, and that Kristian Andersen, who was the candidate of the Christian Democrats, did not support gay marriage.

Due to the dramatic outcome the year before, and that Christian Democrats
were doing relatively well at the opinion polls nationwide before the election, there were some speculation to whether the Christian Democrats could once again challenge Venstre
in getting the mayor's office.  However, depsite the Christian Democrats increasing their vote share, and Venstre decreasing their vote share, both parties kept the same number of seats, and it was later announced that Hans Østergaard would continue for a 2nd term.

Electoral system
For elections to Danish municipalities, a number varying from 9 to 31 are chosen to be elected to the municipal council. The seats are then allocated using the D'Hondt method and a closed list proportional representation.
Ringkøbing-Skjern Municipality had 29 seats in 2021

Unlike in Danish General Elections, in elections to municipal councils, electoral alliances are allowed.

Electoral alliances  

Electoral Alliance 1

Electoral Alliance 2

Electoral Alliance 3

Results

Notes

References 

Ringkøbing-Skjern